Polystira sunderlandi is a species of sea snail, a marine gastropod mollusk in the family Turridae, the turrids.

Description
Original description: "Shell small for genus, fusiform, elongate, with high, elevated spire; 6 raised, bladelike, spiral cords on body whorl; spire whorls with 3 cords: cords all equally-spaced and equal-sized; siphonal canal long, straight, with numerous small spiral cords and spiral threads; anal notch narrow, deep, aligned with second cord; shell color light brown with single narrow white band that corresponds to second cord from suture; 
siphonal canal tan with dark brown anterior tip; interior of aperture tan."

Distribution
Locus typicus: "(Dredged from) 150 metres depth
50 kilometres South of Apalachicola, Florida, USA."

This marine species occurs in the North Atlantic Ocean off Florida
at a depth of 150 m.

References

 Petuch, E. J. 1987. New Caribbean Molluscan Faunas. p. 19, pl. 6, figs. 13–14

External links
 Todd J.A. & Rawlings T.A. (2014). A review of the Polystira clade — the Neotropic's largest marine gastropod radiation (Neogastropoda: Conoidea: Turridae sensu stricto). Zootaxa. 3884(5): 445–491

sunderlandi
Gastropods described in 1987